Elections to Sheffield City Council were held on 7 May 1998. One third of the council was up for election, and the Labour Party kept overall control of the council.

Election result

This result had the following consequences for the total number of seats on the Council after the elections:

Ward results

By-elections between 1998 and 1999

|- style="background-color:#F9F9F9"
! style="background-color: " |
| Independent Green
| Pete Hartley
| align="right" | 20
| align="right" | 1.2
| align="right" | +1.2
|-

References

1998 English local elections
1998
1990s in Sheffield